The 2006 U.S. Women's Open was the 61st U.S. Women's Open, held June 30 to July 3 at Newport Country Club in Newport, Rhode Island.

Delayed by fog for a day, the first round started on Friday and the final two rounds were played on Sunday.  The champion was Annika Sörenstam, the winner of an 18-hole playoff on Monday over Pat Hurst by four strokes,  The two had finished at even par (284) after 72 holes on Sunday, two strokes ahead of Se Ri Pak, Stacy Prammanasudh, and Michelle Wie. It was Sörenstam's third victory in the championship, the first in a decade after winning consecutive titles in 1995 and 1996, and was her tenth and final major championship victory. With the win, Sörenstam went over $20 million in career earnings.

American collegians Amanda Blumenherst and Jane Park were the low amateurs and finished tied for tenth.

This was the final full-round playoff in the U.S. Women's Open; the format was changed to a three-hole aggregate for 2007 and first used in 2011. The event was televised by ESPN and NBC Sports, with the Monday playoff on ESPN.

Past champions in the field

Made the cut

Missed the cut

68 players made the cut at 150 (+8) or better

Course layout

Source:

Round summaries

First round
Friday, June 30, 2006

Source:

Second round
Saturday, July 1, 2006

Source:

Third round
Sunday, July 2, 2006 (morning)

Final round
Sunday, July 2, 2006 (afternoon)

Scorecard

Cumulative tournament scores, relative to par
{|class="wikitable" span = 50 style="font-size:85%;
|-
|style="background: Pink;" width=10|
|Birdie
|style="background: PaleGreen;" width=10|
|Bogey
|style="background: Green;" width=10|
|Double bogey
|style="background: Olive;" width=10|
|Triple bogey+
|}
Source:

Playoff 
Monday, July 3, 2006

Scorecard

{|class="wikitable" span = 50 style="font-size:85%;
|-
|style="background: Pink;" width=10|
|Birdie
|style="background: PaleGreen;" width=10|
|Bogey
|style="background: Green;" width=10|
|Double bogey
|}
Source:

References

External links

Golf Observer final leaderboard
U.S. Women's Open Golf Championship
U.S. Women's Open – past champions – 2006

U.S. Women's Open
Golf in Rhode Island
Sports competitions in Rhode Island
Newport, Rhode Island
Women in Rhode Island
U.S. Women's Open
U.S. Women's Open
U.S. Women's Open
U.S. Women's Open
U.S. Women's Open